The 2012–13 CEV Cup was the 41st edition of the European CEV Cup volleyball club tournament.

Turkish club Halkbank Ankara beat Italian Andreoli Latina in the finale. American player William Reid Priddy was Most Valuable Player of the tournament.

Participating teams

Main phase

16th Finals
The 16 winning teams from the 1/16 Finals competed in the 1/8 Finals playing Home & Away matches. The losers of the 1/16 Final matches qualified for the 3rd round in Challenge Cup.

|}

First leg

|}

Second leg

|}

8th Finals

|}

First leg

|}

Second leg

|}

4th Finals

|}

First leg

|}

Second leg

|}

Challenge phase

|}

First leg 

|}

Second leg 

|}

Final phase

Semi finals

|}

First leg

|}

Second leg

|}

Final

First leg

|}

Second leg

|}

Final standing

References

External links
 Official site

2012-13
2012 in volleyball
2013 in volleyball